Carex preslii is a tussock-forming species of perennial sedge in the family Cyperaceae. It is native to eastern parts of North America from Alaska in the north to California in the south.

See also
List of Carex species

References

preslii
Plants described in 1855
Taxa named by Ernst Gottlieb von Steudel
Flora of Alaska
Flora of Alberta
Flora of British Columbia
Flora of Yukon
Flora of California
Flora of Washington (state)
Flora of Montana
Flora of Oregon
Flora of Idaho